Fredrik Wallumrød (born 21 September 1973 in Kongsberg, Norway) is a Norwegian drummer and composer, known for his collaborations with musicians like Karl Seglem, Trygve Seim, Solveig Slettahjell, Jarle Bernhoft, Lene Marlin, Maria Mena, and the band Span. He is the younger brother of the pianist Christian Wallumrød, older brother of the singer Susanna Wallumrød, and cousin to the pianist David Wallumrød.

Career
Wallumrød is educated at the Jazz Program at Trondheim Musikkonservatorium (1992). He started the Funk jazz electronica band Squid, together with bassist Vemund Stavnes. The two of them later joined the rock band Span replacing Rouge (Roger Zernichow-Brekke) på bass og Rage V (Vegard Eriksfallet) på trommer. Here the collaboration with vocalist Burn (Jarle Bernhoft) started.

Now he also plays within the metal band "Dog Almighty" together with Fridtjof "Joff" Nilsen and Kim Nordbæk, and the rock band "El Caco" including Anders Gjesti (guitar) and Øyvind Osa (bass guitar).

Discography

Within Squid, together with Vemund Stavnes
1998 Super (Forward Records), (including Trygve Seim and Solveig Slettahjell)

With Karl Seglem
2002: Nye Nord (NorCD)

Within Vintermåne
2002: Vintermåne (2L)

Within Span
2003: Mass Distraction (Island Records)
2005: Vs. Time (Johnny Nowhere / Mercury)

With Maria Mena
2004: You're the Only One (Columbia)
2004: Mellow (Columbia)

With Lene Marlin
2005: Lost in a Moment (Virgin)

With Susanna and the Magical Orchestra
2009: Susanna and the Magical Orchestra – 3 (Rune Grammofon)

Within Container
2011: Container (Toothfairy)

With El Caco
2009 Heat
2012 Hatred, Love and Diagrams

References

External links
Fredrik Wallumrød at Groove.no

1973 births
Living people
Musicians from Kongsberg
Norwegian University of Science and Technology alumni
20th-century Norwegian drummers
21st-century Norwegian drummers
Norwegian jazz drummers
Male drummers
20th-century drummers
20th-century Norwegian male musicians
21st-century Norwegian male musicians
Male jazz musicians